Bates's paradise flycatcher (Terpsiphone batesi) is a passerine bird belonging to the monarch-flycatcher family, Monarchidae. The sexes are similar in appearance with the upper parts being rufous and the head and underparts being bluish-grey. It is native to central Africa where it is found in the understorey of forests.

Taxonomy and systematics
Its name commemorates the American ornithologist George Latimer Bates. Bates's paradise flycatcher was formerly considered as a subspecies of the rufous-vented paradise flycatcher but is now recognized as a separate species. An alternate name is the Cameroon rufous-vented paradise-flycatcher.

Subspecies
There are two subspecies recognized:
 T. b. batesi – Chapin, 1921: Found from southern Cameroon and Gabon to eastern Democratic Republic of Congo
 Bannerman's paradise-flycatcher (T. b. bannermani) – Chapin, 1948: Formerly considered by some authorities as a separate species. Found in Congo, southwestern Democratic Republic of Congo and northern Angola

Description
Bates's paradise flycatcher is usually 18 centimetres long but males in parts of Cameroon and Angola have elongated central tail-feathers making them 23-28 centimetres long. The head and underparts are blue-grey while the upperparts are rufous. The sexes are similar in coloration. The song is a series of ringing "tswee" notes.

The rufous-vented paradise flycatcher is similar in appearance but has a darker head with a crest and males always have elongated central tail-feathers.

Distribution
It inhabits the understorey of forests. It occurs from Cameroon and the south-western Central African Republic through Equatorial Guinea, Gabon, the Republic of the Congo and much of the Democratic Republic of the Congo south as far as north-west Angola.

References

Beolens, Bo & Watkins, Michael (2003) Whose Bird?: Men and women commemorated in the common names of birds, Christopher Helm, London.
Sinclair, Ian & Ryan, Peter (2003) Birds of Africa south of the Sahara, Struik, Cape Town.

Terpsiphone
Birds of Central Africa
Bates's paradise flycatcher
Bates's paradise flycatcher